ThunderCats Roar is an American animated television series developed by Victor Courtright and Marly Halpern-Graser for Cartoon Network. Produced by Warner Bros. Animation, it premiered on February 22, 2020. It is the third television series in the ThunderCats franchise after the original series and the 2011 television series. It is Jules Bass's only solo work without his partner Arthur Rankin Jr., who died on January 30, 2014. The show's premise is similar to the original series; in which the ThunderCats escape their dying homeworld Thundera, crash-land on Third Earth, and face off against various villains led by the evil overlord Mumm-Ra. Like Teen Titans Go!, ThunderCats Roar sports a more light-hearted, comedic tone than previous incarnations. The series was critically panned for its animation, humor and characterizations, and it ended on December 5, 2020, being cancelled after just one season. Following Jules Bass' death on October 25, 2022, it was his last television production.

Premise
Lion-O, Tygra, Panthro, Cheetara, WilyKit and WilyKat barely escape the sudden destruction of their homeworld, Thundera, only to crash-land on the mysterious and exotic planet of Third Earth. Lion-O, the newly appointed Lord of the ThunderCats, attempts to lead the team as they make this planet their new home. A bizarre host of creatures and villains stand in their way, including the evil Mumm-Ra, Third Earth's wicked ruler who will let nothing, including the ThunderCats, stop his tyrannical reign over the planet.

Characters

ThunderCats
 Lion-O (voiced by Max Mittelman) – A lion-themed Thunderian and the newly crowned leader of the ThunderCats who still acts like a child. In this adaption, he has a twin sister named Lion-S who is a wanted criminal.
 Tygra (voiced by Patrick Seitz) – A tiger-themed Thunderian who is the serious and most mature member of the team. He's a bit of a clean freak and the target of most jokes throughout the show.
 Cheetara (voiced by Erica Lindbeck) – A cheetah-themed Thunderian who is the fastest member of the team and a professional athlete.
 Panthro (voiced by Chris Jai Alex) – A panther-themed Thunderian who is the strongest and smartest member of the team.
 WilyKit (voiced by Erica Lindbeck) – A wildcat-themed Thunderian, one half of the ThunderKittens, and WilyKat's fraternal twin sister. She is a tomboy obsessed with fighting and fun in this incarnation.
 WilyKat (voiced by Max Mittelman) – A wildcat-themed Thunderian, one half of the ThunderKittens, and WilyKit's fraternal twin brother. He is the more mature twin, armed with chemical capsules in this incarnation.
 Snarf (voiced by Victor Courtright) – The team's mascot and Lion-O's pet. In this show, Snarf is depicted as a robot animal and possibly the smartest of the ThunderCats.
 Jaga (voiced by Larry Kenney) – A jaguar-themed Thunderian who is the ThunderCats' deceased mentor and the narrator for the series' pilot episode. He later got free from the Astral Plane so he could tell the ThunderCats about Thundera's destruction after his battle with Ratar-O and the Sword of Plun-Darr. In this incarnation, Jaga is indirectly responsible for both the destruction of Thundera and his own death because he threw the Sword of Plun-Darr into Thundera's core in an attempt to dispose of it.

Villains
 Mumm-Ra (voiced by Patrick Seitz) – A mummy sorcerer and the main antagonist of the series. He enslaved Third Earth for centuries before the ThunderCats de-powered him at the end of "Exodus: Part 2" by breaking his staff. He now tries every chance he gets to regain his full might, using various artifacts, the Ancient Spirits of Evil, and a shady alliance with the Mutants to do it.
 Mutants – A group of creatures from the planet Plun-Darr who become allied with Mumm-Ra.
 Slithe (voiced by Trevor Devall) – The leader of the Mutants who resembles an overweight lizard man with sharp fangs.
 Jackalman (voiced by Andrew Kishino) – The hyperactive and most dimwitted member of the Mutants who resembles a humanoid jackal.
 Monkian (voiced by Jim Meskimen) – The physically-strongest member of the Mutants who resembles a humanoid white ape and likes smashing and bashing.
 Vultureman (voiced by Dana Snyder) – The Mutants' resident tech-geek and pilot who resembles a humanoid vulture. He once tried to plagiarize one of Panthro's inventions and nearly got killed for it.
 Ratar-O (voiced by Crispin Freeman) – The rat-like ruler of the Mutants who faced Jaga some years before Thundera exploded. While in space, Ratar-O reclaimed the Sword of Plun-Darr and plans to come after the ThunderCats.
 Ancient Spirits of Evil (voiced by Chris Jai Alex) – A group of evil spirits who transform Mumm-Ra into Mumm-Ra the Ever-Living. They are far less intelligent than in the previous adaptions and their statues are activated by a plug.
 Driller (voiced by Stephen Tobolowsky) – A drill-themed robotic villain who must constantly drill for diamonds in order to power his drill to keep drilling for diamonds. Unlike the original series, he becomes an ally of the ThunderCats.
 Molly Lava (voiced by Kaitlyn Robrock) – An evil space criminal from the episode "Mandora – The Evil Chaser" who turns from a cute little gem rock into a lava monster when she jumps into a volcano. Mandora is in pursuit of her when Lion-O inadvertently releases her from prison, but she is eventually defeated and re-imprisoned by Lion-O and Mandora at the end.
 Berserkers – A group of cybernetic Viking-like pirates that will do any service for gold.
 Hammerhead (voiced by Trevor Devall) – The captain of the Berserkers who has a cybernetic arm that can punch and pound with great force.
 Topspinner (voiced by Erica Lindbeck) – A member of the Berserkers who can spin at high speeds.
 Ram Bam (voiced by Dana Snyder) – A member of the Berserkers who rolls by the wheel embedded in his chest at high speeds to smash through objects like a battering ram.
 Cruncher (voiced by Chris Jai Alex) – A hulking member of the Berserkers whose sheer strength can crush buildings and boulders with ease.
 Safari Joe (voiced by Trevor Devall) – An intergalactic big-game hunter.
 Lion-S (voiced by Laila Berzins) – A lion-themed Thunderian and a wanted criminal. Lion-O saw her as a kindred spirit due to their different sword tricks until he learned about her criminal past. At the end of "Claudus", it was revealed that she is Lion-O's twin sister implying she was actually a princess who rebelled against the other Thunderians in the past sometime before Thundera exploded.
 Spidera – The queen of the spiders who appeared in the episode "Schnorp".
 The Lunataks – A group of six oni-like creatures who appear in the episode "The Space Beam".
 Luna (voiced by Kaitlyn Robrock) – The leader of the Lunataks.
 Mongor (voiced by Andrew Morgado) – A goat-like demon that feeds off fear.
 Swampy Johnny (voiced by Robbie Daymond) – An aquatic Elvis Presley-like villain who is pursued by the Terrators, whose homeworld was flooded by him. He comes dangerously close to doing the same with Third Earth. Cheetara developed a crush on him before learning of his true colors.
 Eclipsorr – The CEO of the Eclipsor Corporation, an amoral company that wants to steal the energy of Third Earth's sun and sell it for a profit.
 Grune (voiced by Thundercat) – A Smilodon-themed Thunderian who once tried to overthrow Claudus and was trapped in a crystal prison by Jaga.

Other characters
 Berbils (voiced by Dana Snyder) – A race of robotic bears that the ThunderCats befriend after crash-landing on Third Earth. They are small, but strong in packs. They live for construction and are responsible for building both the Cats' Lair and Castle Plun-Darr in this incarnation of the show.
 Gwen the Unicorn (voiced by Kaitlyn Robrock) – The leader of the magical unicorns of Third Earth. When all of the unicorns are kidnapped, she turns to the ThunderCats for help. Her character is based on the titular character from The Last Unicorn.
 Willa (voiced by Laila Berzins) – The large leader of the Warrior Maidens of Third Earth who speaks through roars or short bursts of sentences.
 Nayda (voiced by Cindy Robinson) – The second-in-command of the Warrior Maidens and Willa's translator.
 Mandora the Evil-Chaser (voiced by Erica Lindbeck) – An intergalactic police officer of the universe who would often be annoyed with Lion-O's incompetence.
 Dr. Dometome (voiced by Trevor Devall) – A Third Earth scientist with a robotic "son", Hercules. He takes it upon himself to fix the mess Lion-O creates when he drains Third Earth of the ocean, and floods the city beneath it.
 Mayor Fungustus (voiced by Patrick Seitz) – The mayor of the Moldian world under the ocean, who decides to shoot Lion-O, Dr. Dometome, and Hercules into the "sun" (Third Earth's molten core) when he learns they flooded their world by pulling the plug.
 Moldians (voiced by Kaitlyn Robrock) – A race of small fungal creatures whose world is flooded when Lion-O pulls the plug in the ocean, reversing the flow of gravity.
 Micrits – A race of tiny humans.
 Emperor Toadius (voiced by Steve Blum) – The ruler of the Micrits.
 Prince Starling (voiced by Cedric L. Williams) – The fallen hero of the Micrits who became delusional after searching for the World Tree to drink of its waters and defeat Lion-O.
 Micrit Elder (voiced by Cindy Robinson) – The unnamed elder of the Micrits.
 Mumm-Rana (voiced by Kaitlyn Robrock) – A mummy sorceress and the good opposite of Mumm-Ra who resides in the White Pyramid.
 Mumm-Randall (voiced by Victor Courtright) – A slow-moving donkey who is owned by a Wolo and is actually the neutral opposite of Mumm-Ra and Mumm-Rana. He is a minor character exclusive to the show.
 The Netherwitch (voiced by Cree Summer) – An inter-dimensional sorceress. Previously in the original 1985 version of the series, she was just a disguise/alias Mumm-Ra took on, but is now a separate character here.
 Barbastella (voiced by Danielle Pinnock) – A humanoid bat who is the Queen of the Bats. Panthro develops a crush on her. Her former girlfriend is the Queen of the Rats.
 Claudus (voiced by Andrew Morgado) – A lion-themed Thunderian who is the father of Lion-O and Lion-S. In this show, Claudus acts like a jerk and a bad ruler.
 Wizz-Ra – An ancient sorcerer who appears on everything what is shining. He is a good guy.

Production
A third ThunderCats animated series, ThunderCats Roar, was in development and was picked up by Cartoon Network. It was originally scheduled to premiere in 2019, but was delayed to 2020. The show was developed by Victor Courtright and Marly Halpern-Graser. Courtright previously worked on the Disney XD series Pickle and Peanut as a writer/storyboard artist and created the Cartoon Network digital series Get 'Em Tommy!. Halpern-Graser previously worked as a writer for various DC Nation Shorts and was co-creator of the Disney XD series Right Now Kapow.

ThunderCats Roar was cancelled after just one season, less than a year after it premiered. On November 20, 2020, it was confirmed by the show's writer and producer Marly Halpern-Graser in a tweet that the episode "Mandora Saves Christmas" would be the last episode of the series.

Episodes

Broadcast and release
The first two episodes were released on the Cartoon Network app on January 10, 2020. ThunderCats Roar premiered on Cartoon Network UK on April 6, 2020. ThunderCats Roar later premiered on Cartoon Network Africa on May 25, 2020.

Reception
ThunderCats Roar'''s announcement was met with backlash from fans of the original series and its 2011 reboot. On Cartoon Network's YouTube channel, promotional videos for the series have received a large number of dislikes. The series was panned by critics and audience for its art style, characterizations and comedic tone, drawing unfavorable comparisons to Teen Titans Go!.

In a positive review, Reuben Baron of Comic Book Resources says "ThunderCats Roar'' knows what it wants to be, and a few pacing quibbles aside, it does it well."

Notes

References

External links
 

Roar
2020s American animated television series
2020s American comic science fiction television series
2020 American television series debuts
2020 American television series endings
American children's animated action television series
American children's animated space adventure television series
American children's animated comic science fiction television series
American children's animated science fantasy television series
Anime-influenced Western animated television series
Animated television series about cats
Animated television series about extraterrestrial life
Cartoon Network original programming
English-language television shows
Television series by Warner Bros. Animation
Television series set on fictional planets
Animated television series reboots
Animation controversies in television
Television series about mutants